Iskra is a Slovenian and former Yugoslavian company for electromechanics, telecommunications, electronics and automation.

History 
Iskra developed from the SPRAD and a modest factory in Kranj / Strojne tovarne Kranj, a former subsidiary of the Luftfahrtgerätewerk, Berlin. 

In 1946, prof. dr. Mirjan Gruden renamed Strojne tovarne Kranj to Iskra (in Slovenian: Spark).

One year after it was established, Iskra developed its first switch, followed by its first FM antenna, capacitor, and then one of the key milestones in Iskra's success – the establishment of its design department. In 1962, this was the first industrial design department in Yugoslavia.

The bureau for railway automation, BAŽ, was founded.

In the 1970s, Iskra developed into the largest Yugoslavian company for electromechanics, telecommunications, electronics and automation, proving itself time and time again with exceptional industrial design in telephony, measuring instruments, and machinery. At the start of the 1990s, Iskra's logo was on all electrical devices, and the product portfolio was expanded with measuring instruments, short-wave navy radio receivers, drilling machines, movie projectors, etc.

In 1989, Iskra SOZD consisted of the following organizations:
 Iskra Banka
 Iskra Commerce
 Iskra Servis
 Iskra Telematika
 Iskra Delta
 Iskra Kibernetika
 Iskra električna orodja
 Iskra Elektrozveze
 Iskra Merilna elektronika
 Iskra Elektrooptika
 Iskra Avtomatika
 Iskra Orodja
 Iskra Elementi
 Iskra Mikroelektronika
 Iskra Antene
 Iskra Elekroakustika
 Iskra Elektromotorji
 Iskra Videomatika
 Iskra Rotomatika
 Iskra Avtoelektrika
 Iskra Kondenzatorji
 Iskra Baterije Zmaj
 Iskra Institut za kakovost
 Iskra "ZORIN"
 Iskra Invest servis
 Iskra High School
 
Following the breakup of Yugoslavia,  it is now a company in Slovenia. The company's operations in Slovenia were divided into many separate companies, including Iskratel, Iskra Avtoelektrika, Iskraemeco, Fotona, Iskra Amesi, Iskra, elektro in elektronska industrija, d.d. (Iskra d.d. for short)

Today 

Iskra d.o.o has been the largest knowledge hub in the region for 75 years.  Iskra d.o.o is operating in the areas of
 Energy sector
 Electrotechnical components
 Efficient Installations
 Traffic
 Telecommunications
 Security, supply and facility management

References

Companies of Yugoslavia
Electrical equipment manufacturers
Manufacturing companies of Slovenia
Slovenian brands